Thomas Jameson may refer to:

 Thomas Jameson (cricketer, born 1908) (1908–1989), played for Hampshire
 Thomas Jameson (cricketer, born 1946), played for Cambridge University and Warwickshire
 Tom Jameson (1892–1965), Irish cricketer